Mordellistena nigritarsis is a species of beetle in the genus Mordellistena of the family Mordellidae. It was described by Jan Horák in 1996, and can be found in such countries as Czech Republic, Germany, Slovakia and Near East.

References

Beetles described in 1996
nigritarsis
Beetles of Europe